The 1982 European Weightlifting Championships were held in Hala Tivoli, Ljubljana, SFR Yugoslavia from September 18 to September 26, 1982. This was the 61st edition of the event. There were 138 men in action from 25 nations. This tournament was a part of 1982 World Weightlifting Championships.

Medal summary

Medal table
Ranking by Big (Total result) medals

References
Results (Chidlovski.net)
Панорама спортивного года 1982 / Сост. А. Н. Корольков — М.: Физкультура и спорт, 1983. 

European Weightlifting Championships
European Weightlifting Championships
European Weightlifting Championships
International weightlifting competitions hosted by Yugoslavia
Sports competitions in Ljubljana